Mariefred is a locality situated in Strängnäs Municipality, Södermanland County, Sweden with 3,726 inhabitants in 2010.

The name is derived from that of the former Carthusian monastery here, Mariefred Charterhouse, and means "Peace of Mary" (the former name was Gripsholm). It lies roughly 50 kilometres west of Stockholm.

Mariefred, despite its small population, is for historical reasons often still referred to as a city. Statistics Sweden, however, only counts localities with more than 10,000 inhabitants as cities.

Gripsholm Castle is located in the town. Adjacent to the castle is the nature reserve and deer park Gripsholms hjorthage.

The old barn of Gripsholm Castle was a centre for fine arts printmaking, Grafikens Hus ("House of Graphics").

The East Södermanland Railway has a railway museum here with one of the finest collections of 600 mm narrow-gauge passenger railcars anywhere.

Kurt Tucholsky is buried in the town cemetery.

Notable natives
Swedish pop and jazz singer Lisa Ekdahl was raised in Mariefred.

Swedish actor Dolph Lundgren has a summer home in Mariefred, Kalkudden.

Mikael Samuelsson, a former professional ice hockey player in the NHL, was born in Mariefred. Samuelsson is a member of the exclusive Triple Gold Club, having won the Stanley Cup, Olympics, and World Championship.

References 

Populated places in Södermanland County
Populated places in Strängnäs Municipality
Populated lakeshore places in Sweden